The streak-capped spinetail (Cranioleuca hellmayri) is a species of bird in the family Furnariidae. It is endemic to the Sierra Nevada de Santa Marta.

Its natural habitats are subtropical or tropical moist montane forest and heavily degraded former forest.

References

External links
Image at ADW

streak-capped spinetail
Birds of the Sierra Nevada de Santa Marta
Endemic birds of Colombia
streak-capped spinetail
Taxonomy articles created by Polbot